Gennadi Mikhailovich Karponosov (born 21 November 1950) is an ice dancing coach and a former competitive ice dancer for the Soviet Union. With Natalia Linichuk, he is the 1980 Olympic champion and a two-time World champion.

Competitive career 
Gennadi Karponosov began skating because Alexei Ulanov was his neighbor. He initially competed with Elena Zharkova under coach Tatiana Tarasova but had greater success with his second partner, Natalia Linichuk. 

Linichuk and Karponosov were coached by Elena Tchaikovskaia at Dynamo in Moscow. They won the World Universiade in 1972, and won the bronze medal at the 1974 and 1977 World Championships. They were fourth at the 1976 Winter Olympics, the year ice dancing was introduced as an Olympic sport. 

They won the bronze medals at the European Figure Skating Championships from 1974 through 1977 and  a silver medal in 1978. Linichuk and Karponosov won the world championship in 1978 and 1979 and the European Championships in 1979 and 1980.

Linichuk and Karponosov won the 1980 Olympics, but failed to defend their World title, making them the only team ever to unsuccessfully defend a World title after winning the Olympics. In 1981, Linichuk and Karponosov retired from competition.

Coaching career 

After coaching in Moscow, Linichuk and Karponosov accepted an offer to coach in the U.S. They moved with their students in June 1994 and coached at the University of Delaware in Newark, Delaware. In September 2007, they moved to the Ice Works Skating Complex in Aston, Pennsylvania.

Their current and former senior-level students include:
 Tanith Belbin / Benjamin Agosto (coached from mid-2008 to 2010). 2009 World silver medalists for the U.S.
 Galit Chait / Sergei Sakhnovsky (World bronze medalists)
 Albena Denkova / Maxim Staviski (coached from mid-2005 to 2007). 2006, 2007 World Champions for Bulgaria.
 Oksana Domnina / Maxim Shabalin (coached from mid-2008 to 2010). 2010 Olympic bronze medalists for Russia.
 Oksana Grishuk / Evgeni Platov (Olympic and World champions)
 Natalia Gudina / Alexei Beletski
 Anjelika Krylova / Vladimir Fedorov (World bronze medalists)
 Anjelika Krylova / Oleg Ovsyannikov (World champions, Olympic silver medalists)
 Irina Lobacheva / Ilia Averbukh (World champions, Olympic silver medalists)

Their current and former junior-level students include:
 Lauri Bonacorsi / Travis Mager (from May 2010) 2011 U.S. Junior silver medalists 
 Ekaterina Pushkash and Jonathan Guerreiro (coached from mid-2010 to present). 2011 World Junior silver medalists for Russia.

Personal life 
Karponosov studied international relations at the Public Institute Moscow. Linichuk accepted Karponosov's proposal after they retired from competition. They were married on 31 July 1981. Their daughter, Anastasiya Karponosova, was born in February 1985. The couple initially lived in Moscow and then moved to the United States in the early '90s. In 2001, Karponosov, who is Jewish, was admitted to the International Jewish Sports Hall of Fame.

Competitive highlights

With Linichuk

With Zharkova

See also
List of select Jewish figure skaters

References

External links

Jewish sports bio
Jews in Sports bio

Navigation

1950 births
Figure skaters from Moscow
Living people
Jewish Russian sportspeople
Soviet male ice dancers
Dynamo sports society athletes
Olympic figure skaters of the Soviet Union
Olympic gold medalists for the Soviet Union
Figure skaters at the 1976 Winter Olympics
Figure skaters at the 1980 Winter Olympics
Olympic medalists in figure skating
World Figure Skating Championships medalists
European Figure Skating Championships medalists
Medalists at the 1980 Winter Olympics
Universiade gold medalists for the Soviet Union
Universiade medalists in figure skating
Competitors at the 1972 Winter Universiade
Russian State University of Physical Education, Sport, Youth and Tourism alumni